Luis Julian de Milà y de Borja (1432 Xàtiva, Kingdom of Valencia, Crown of Aragon – 1510 Bèlgida, Kingdom of Valencia, Crown of Aragon) was a cardinal of the Catholic Church.

His parents were Juan de Milà and Catalina de Borja, daughter of Juan Domingo de Borja y Doncel. He was named cardinal on 17 September 1456 by his uncle, the Pope Callixtus III de Borja. He served as administrator and bishop of Segorbe (1453-1459) and Lérida (1461-1509).

See also
 Papal conclave, 1458
 Palace of Milà i Aragó

References

1432 births
1510 deaths
People from Xàtiva
Spanish cardinals
15th-century Roman Catholic bishops in the Kingdom of Aragon
16th-century Roman Catholic bishops in Spain
Bishops of Lleida